Amma Asentewaa Asante (born 14 May 1972) is a Dutch politician. She was a member of the municipal council of Amsterdam from 1998 to 2006 and a member of the House of Representatives of the Netherlands for the Labour Party from 2016 to 2017.

Early life 
Amma Asentewaa Asante was born on 14 May 1972 in Kumasi in Ghana. Her father was initially an illegal immigrant in the Netherlands, but he became a legal resident by a general pardon in 1975. For family reunification, Asante and her mother moved to the Netherlands in 1978. Her father was a factory worker and her mother a chambermaid.

Asante studied political science at the University of Amsterdam.

Politics 
Asante is a member of the Labour Party (PvdA).

She was member of the municipal council of Amsterdam from May 1998 until March 2006.

Asante was number 50 on the candidate list of the Labour Party for the 2012 Dutch general election. She received 4,549 preferential votes, but was initially not elected. She was number 36 on the candidate list of the Labour Party for the 2014 European Parliament election. She received 574 preferential votes, but was not elected.

Asante became a member of the House of Representatives on 7 September 2016, when she replaced Tanja Jadnanansing. Here she is the party spokesperson for higher education. She was number 36 on the candidate list of the Labour Party for the Dutch general election on 15 March 2017. The Labour Party won nine seats in the election, so Asante left the House of Representatives on 23 March 2017.She was number 47 on the candidate list of the Labour Party for the Dutch general election on 17 March 2021.

Personal life 
Asante is married and has two daughters. She lives in Badhoevedorp.

Asante is a Protestant Christian and attends the Triumphant Faith Chapel in Badhoevedorp, where her husband is a pastor. In 2016, when she was asked why she was not member of a confessional political party, Asante said: "Christianity and social democracy are very similar. I feel great in the Labour Party, I feel at home there. My identity is not only established by my religion."

References

External links

  Amma Asante, official website
  Amma Asante at the Labour Party website

1972 births
20th-century Dutch politicians
20th-century Dutch women politicians
21st-century Dutch politicians
21st-century Dutch women politicians
Ghanaian emigrants to the Netherlands
Labour Party (Netherlands) politicians
Living people
Members of the House of Representatives (Netherlands)
Municipal councillors of Amsterdam
People from Kumasi
University of Amsterdam alumni
Dutch Protestants